Barna Kesztyűs (born 4 September 1994) is a Hungarian football player who plays for Pécs on loan from Paks.

Career
On 30 July 2022, Kesztyűs joined Pécs on loan.

Club statistics

Updated to games played as of 15 May 2021.

References

External links

MLSZ 

1993 births
Living people
Sportspeople from Pécs
Hungarian footballers
Association football midfielders
Paksi FC players
Nyíregyháza Spartacus FC players
Budaörsi SC footballers
Budapest Honvéd FC players
Pécsi MFC players
Nemzeti Bajnokság I players
Nemzeti Bajnokság II players